Lavinia Malcolm nee Lavinia Laing (c. 1847 – 2 November 1920) was a Scottish suffragist and local Liberal politician, the first Scottish woman to be elected to a local council (1907) and one of the first women 'mayors' in the UK, as the first female Provost in Scotland in 1913: in the burgh of Dollar, Clackmannanshire.

Early life and entry to politics 
She was born Lavinia Laing in Forres, daughter of an ironmonger and councillor, and granddaughter of a former Provost of Forres and became a teacher in Edinburgh. She appears as a "teacher of drawing" living at 3 Elder Street in Edinburgh's First New Town in 1875.

Lavinia visited Dollar Institution (now Dollar Academy), and fell in love with one of its English teachers, Richard Malcolm FRSGS (1840–1926). Richard was still married to his first wife, Lizzie Halley, when they met. Lizzie died in 1878, which then permitted Lavinia to marry him.

She married him and moved to Dollar. They lived at Burnside House just north of Academy Place. The Malcolms hosted boarders from the school. Their  child, Richard, died when he was eight-years-old, and both the Malcolms then entered local political life with Richard becoming Provost first (1896–9). Lavinia was the only woman elected to the council and returned unopposed, then later unanimously elected as provost by her fellow councillors in 1913.

Malcolm was also a member of both the local School Board and Parish Council. The Chairman of the former described her as "a most valuable assistant", and the Parish Council Chairman stated that  "they could not get on very well without her"

Supporter of women's rights 
Malcolm is one of the first women to be elected lead their town council in the UK prior to 1914,  after Elizabeth Garrett Anderson (Aldeburgh 1908), Sarah Lees (Oldham 1910), Gwenllian Morgan (Brecon 1910).

She was one of the first women to be appointed as a Justice of the Peace.

She campaigned to reduce infant mortality and the underlying causes of poverty and poor sanitation.

She died in Dollar on 2 November 1920 and is buried in Dollar churchyard, close to her home. The grave lies on the north wall at the point where stones are enclosed for safety reasons.

Leaving a legacy
During her life,  Malcolm recognised her own place as a role model for other women.

Speaking in 2007, 100 years after Lavinia Malcolm's  election, the then current Member of the Scottish Parliament (MSP) for Dollar the Scottish National Party's Keith Brown and the Scottish Labour Party's Sarah Boyack both recognised Lavinia Malcolm's example to women, noting
 262 women councillors in Scotland, 20% of the total. 
 43 women MSPs, a third of the total.

Sarah Boyack, said she wants to see equal numbers of women and men in politics."There are plenty of women MSPs, there are women committee conveners, women cabinet ministers, but I would like to see more of a balance and particularly more women coming into local government to give a woman's perspective on things."Ten years on the proportion of women represented in local and national government in Scotland has increased to 29% in councils and 35% in the Scottish Parliament (2017).

See also 
 Women's suffrage in the United Kingdom

References

External links 
 Dollar Town Council

1847 births
1920 deaths
20th-century Scottish politicians
People from Forres
Scottish activists
Scottish suffragists
Scottish women activists
Lord Provosts
20th-century Scottish women
Women provosts in Scotland
Liberal Party (UK) councillors